Dufouriellus ater is a Palearctic species of  true bug It is predatory.

References
 

Anthocorini
Hemiptera of Europe
Insects described in 1833